"Pōkarekare Ana" is a traditional New Zealand love song, probably communally composed about the time World War I began in 1914. The song is written in Māori and has been translated into English. It enjoys widespread popularity in New Zealand as well as some popularity in other countries.

Composition
Eastern Maori politicians Paraire Tomoana and Āpirana Ngata published the song in 1919, but neither of them claimed to have composed it. They explained that it had "emanated North of Auckland" and was popularised by Māori soldiers who were training near Auckland before embarking for the war in Europe.

The Māori words have remained virtually unaltered over the decades, with only the waters in the first line being localized. For example, some versions refer to Lake Rotorua in the North Island. It is then associated with the story of Hinemoa swimming across the lake to her forbidden lover, Tūtānekai, on Mokoia Island. However, there have been many different English translations.

"Pōkarekare Ana" was originally written predominantly in triple time, with the verse in duple time, but has been more commonly heard in duple time since World War II.

Lyrics and melody

Use
The song is very popular in New Zealand, and has been adapted for multiple purposes, including in advertising and by sporting groups. Notable uses include:
"Sailing Away", which promoted New Zealand's 1987 America's Cup challenge, and featured an ensemble choir of famous New Zealanders recording as "All of Us".
It was used in multiple TV advertisements for Air New Zealand in the 1990s (using a recording with Kiri Te Kanawa) and in 2000. Air New Zealand also used the song again in 2020 to mark the 80th birthday of New Zealand's national airline, this time, using a recording from Hayley Westenra.
In April 2013, members and spectators in the New Zealand Parliament sang "Pōkarekare Ana" after the house passed the bill legalising same-sex marriage in New Zealand.

In popular culture, "Pōkarekare Ana" was used as the theme song for the 2005 South Korean film Crying Fist.

Versions

Recordings
Dozens of recording artists throughout the world have performed and recorded the song.

A version of "Pōkarekare Ana" by Rhonda Bryers appears on the 1981 CBS various artists album The Mauri Hikitia.

Among New Zealand opera singers to record and perform "Pōkarekare Ana" are Kiri Te Kanawa and Malvina Major.

"Pōkarekare Ana" was featured on the 2003 album Pure, by the New Zealand soprano Hayley Westenra.

A version of the song features on the self-titled album by Angelis, a British classical crossover singing group.

On the CD Classical-Crossover Compilation 2011, Hollie Steel sings "Pōkarekare Ana". Steel later released the song as a charity single for those suffering from the 2011 earthquake in Christchurch, New Zealand.

Adaptations
The song was introduced to South Korea by New Zealand soldiers fighting in the Korean War. It was eventually given Korean lyrics and a Korean title, "Yeonga", and has become popular across the country.

The melody of "Pōkarekare Ana" was used for an Irish hymn to the Blessed Virgin: "A Mhuire Mháthair, sé seo mo ghuí".

A homophonous translation into Hebrew was composed in 2007 by Ghil'ad Zuckermann. In this translation the approximate sounds of the Māori words are retained while Hebrew words with similar meanings are used. In this translation, however, "Waiapu" is replaced by "Rotorua" (oto rúakh, Hebrew for "that wind").

References

Further reading
 "Hoki mai ra – A unique find" by Michael Brown, 11 August 2014, National Library of New Zealand

External links
 Armstrong, Alan Haere Mai (1985) Viking Sevenseas Ltd 
 "Pōkarekare Ana – A Māori Love Song", documentary, NZ On Screen
 , sung a cappella by Marie Te Hapuku, with vintage photos of Māori women
 , Teddy Tahu Rhodes
 , sung by Hayley Westenra
 

1914 songs
New Zealand folk songs
Māori music
Māori-language songs